The Men's South American Volleyball Championship is the official competition for senior men's national volleyball teams of South America, organized by the Confederación Sudamericana de Voleibol (CSV). The initial gap between championships was variable, but since 1967 they have been awarded every two years. The competition has been dominated by Brazil, which won 33 of the 34 editions. The only tournament not won by Brazil was the 1964 championship, when the team did not compete due to political turmoil in the country.

History

Medals summary

MVP by edition
1951–2005 – Unknown

2007 – 
2009 – 
2011 – 
2013 – 
2015 – 
2017 – 
2019 – 
2021 –

See also

 South American Women's Volleyball Championship
 Men's U23 South American Volleyball Championship
 Men's Junior South American Volleyball Championship
 Boys' Youth South American Volleyball Championship
 Boys' U17 South American Volleyball Championship
 Volleyball at the Pan American Games
 Men's Pan-American Volleyball Cup

References

External links
Official website
Confederación Sudamericana de Voleibol – Historical Ranking

 
 
V
Volleyball competitions in South America
International volleyball competitions
International men's volleyball competitions
South American championships
Biennial sporting events
1951 establishments in South America